Lubuli is a town in southeastern Eswatini (Swaziland). It is located close to the South African border just to the northwest of the town of Nsoko on the road between there and Maloma.

References
Fitzpatrick, M., Blond, B., Pitcher, G., Richmond, S., and Warren, M. (2004)  South Africa, Lesotho and Swaziland. Footscray, VIC: Lonely Planet.

Populated places in Eswatini